Fulvia Furlan (born 24 July 1958) is a former Italian female long-distance runner and cross-country runner who competed at individual senior level at the World Athletics Cross Country Championships (1988).

References

External links
 

1958 births
Living people
Italian female middle-distance runners
Italian female cross country runners
Athletes from Milan